Tahera Kabir (died 10 October 1980) was a Bangladeshi social activist. She received Independence Day Award on 1979 for her contribution in social welfare activity.

Work
Kabir founded the Association for the Correction and Social Rehabilitation of Bangladesh to help the poor and homeless people of society. The NGO runs a shelter house for orphans and homeless street children  in Mirpur, Dhaka.

Personal life and death
Tahera Kabir was married to Alamgir M. A. Kabir. She was the eldest daughter of Khwaja Shahabuddin, who belonged to the Nawab family of Dhaka.

Tahera Kabir died on 10 October 1980.

References

Bangladeshi social workers
Bangladeshi women activists
Members of the Dhaka Nawab family
Recipients of the Independence Day Award
Year of birth missing
Place of birth missing
1980 deaths